Privolye is a rural locality (a village) in Bryzgalovskoye Rural Settlement, Kameshkovsky District, Vladimir Oblast, Russia. The population was 63 as of 2010.

Geography 
Privolye is located on the Uvod River, 17 km northeast of Kameshkovo (the district's administrative centre) by road. Pobochnevo is the nearest rural locality.

References 

Rural localities in Kameshkovsky District